Halocarpus is a genus of conifers of the family Podocarpaceae. The genus includes three closely related species of evergreen trees and shrubs, all endemic to New Zealand.

Extant species
Three species are accepted :

References

External links 
 Halocarpus At: Podocarpaceae At: The Gymnosperm Database

Podocarpaceae
Trees of New Zealand
Podocarpaceae genera
Endemic flora of New Zealand